Mews Small (born Mary Edith Wilard Small; March 20, 1942 in Pasadena, California) is an American actress and singer. She was known professionally as Marya Small during the 1970s and has also been credited as Merrya Small, Mary Small Rusk, and Mary Small.

Acting career

Small got her acting start in a 1966 theatre production of The Sound of Music in Stowe, Vermont. She has since acted in numerous feature films and television shows.

Small originated the role of Frenchy in the original Broadway production of the musical Grease, with a cast including Barry Bostwick and Adrienne Barbeau. She was later joined by cast members John Travolta, Patrick Swayze, Treat Williams, and Marilu Henner.

Small is best known for her roles as Candy in the film One Flew Over the Cuckoo's Nest and Dr. Nero in Woody Allen's film Sleeper. She also portrayed the Janis Joplin-inspired role of Frankie in the animated rotoscope film American Pop. Small appeared in the first episode of "Kolchak: The Night Stalker" in 1975.

Mews is the lead singer of her band Mews Small and The Small Band, who has released a CD Do What You Do in 2008. She also sings regularly with Suzy Williams, and the two have written songs together.

Politics
Mews Small ran as the Natural Law Party nominee for the United States House of Representatives for California's 25th congressional district in 2000. She received 1.35% or 3,010 votes.

Filmography

The Trouble with Angels (1966) – Nun (uncredited)
Sleeper (1973) – Dr. Nero 
’’Maude - The Commuter Station’’ (1974) - The Girlfriend
The Wild Party (1975) – Bertha
One Flew Over the Cuckoo's Nest (1975) – Candy
The Last of the Cowboys (1977) – Alice
The Great Smokey Roadblock (1977) – Slave Girl #2 
Thank God It's Friday (1978) – Jackie
The Dukes of Hazzard (1979) – Frankie
Dreamer (1979) – Elaine
Fade to Black (1980) – Doreen (uncredited)
American Pop (1981) –Frankie
Zapped! (1982) – Mrs. Springboro
National Lampoon's Class Reunion (1982) – Iris Augen
Young Lust (1987) – Connie
Five Corners (1987) – Woman in Deli
Puppet Master (1989) – Theresa
Man on the Moon (1999) – TM Administrator
A Wake in Providence (1999) – Casting Director (voice)
Raw Footage (2005) – Wedding Guest
The Gift: At Risk (2007) – Mother Superior
Boppin' at the Glue Factory (2009) –  Mary LeDoux

References

External links
 
 
 
 

American stage actresses
American film actresses
American television actresses
American women singers
1942 births
Living people
People from Pasadena, California
21st-century American women